Yernes y Tameza is a municipality in the Autonomous Community of the Principality of Asturias, Spain. It is situated in the east-central zone of the principality, between mountains high along the Cubia River. It is bordered on the west, north, and northeast by Grado, on the southeast by Proaza, and on the south by Teverga. The municipality has an abrupt topography, most notable in the peak Caldoveiru (1,357 m) and the Tameza River, which crosses the municipality from south to north.

It is one of the smallest municipalities in Asturias. Its current population (according to the 2005 census) of 197 (99 male and 98 female) is the smallest among the Asturian municipalities.

The province is named after its two parishes, Yernes and Tameza ("y" is Spanish for "and"). The capital is Villabre; other villages include: Fuxóu, Vindías, Villuarrí, and Yernes.

The people practice high mountain ranching and subsistence agriculture. In livestock, cattle and horses are the most important, in particular the Asturian mountain breeds, such as the Asturcon. The most frequently cultivated crops are the potato, cereal, vegetables, and hay.

The municipality has many mountain paths as well as the Paraje Natural (Natural Park) of Pico Caldoveiru.

History

The king Ordoño I of Asturias gave part of Yernes to the Cathedral of San Salvador in Oviedo in the year 857, which was later made into the whole territory thanks to donations of various nobles. In 1174, Ferdinand II of León gave up his rights over the territory of the church of Oviedo, which was made into an episcopal municipality, as can be seen in the municipal coat of arms. In 1579, thanks to a papal bull from Pope Gregory XIII, Philip II of Spain got the area to return to the crown of Spain.

Two years later, the 130 inhabitants of the time purchased the municipality from the king for 12,691,922 maravedíes. They named as representative of the king Juan de Grijalba, who designated the first town councillors and gave them the task of establishing the laws and ordinances of the municipality. These duties were carried out by two magistrates, two councillors, a mayor of the Hermandad, and an agent for the nobility, and a judge, a councillor, and another mayor of the Hermandad for the ordinary people. The capital of the municipality was established in Villabre in 1584, where it remains.

Demography

Geography

Practically all the municipality is at a height between 400 and 1,200 meters, with a slope in more than the half of the surface between the 21 and the 60%.

The Villabre river crosses Yernes y Tameza from South to North, linking with Cubia river in the neighboring municipality of Grado.

Art
The municipality is not especially noted for its architecture.  It has two chapels dedicated to Santiago and Santa Cristina de Lena, and there are parish churches of Santa María de Tameza and Santa Cruz de Yernes.

Among its vernacular architecture, the most notable is an ancient palace with a chapel that belonged to the family López del Vallado. There are also the remains of a tower near the capital.

References

External links

City hall website 
Federación Asturiana de Concejos 
Aula Vital, La Collada del Puerto - Yernes, Aula de Energías Renovables en plena Naturaleza 
Asturias Nature and landscape photography - Un entorno Vital, Naturaleza de Yernes y Tameza, Paisaje y fauna y flora. 

Municipalities in Asturias